Rachel Eliza Griffiths (born 1978) is an American poet, novelist, photographer and visual artist, who is the author of five published collections of poems. In her most recent book, Seeing the Body (2020), she "pairs poetry with photography, exploring memory, Black womanhood, the American landscape, and rebirth." It was a nominee for the 2021 NAACP Image Award in Poetry. Griffiths, who also has a novel forthcoming, lives in New York City.

Career
Born in Washington, D.C., Griffiths graduated from St. Mark's High School and the University of Delaware, where she earned her undergraduate degree and her first master's degree. She received the MFA in creative writing from Sarah Lawrence College. She has been awarded several fellowships, including from Cave Canem Foundation, Kimbilio, Millay Colony, Vermont Studio Center, Provincetown Fine Arts Work Center, Robert Rauschenberg Foundation, and Yaddo.

Among the many journals, periodicals and other outlets in which Griffiths has been published are The New Yorker, The Paris Review, The New York Times, Virginia Quarterly Review, The Progressive, The Georgia Review, Gulf Coast, Callaloo, Poets & Writers, American Poetry Review, Los Angeles Review of Books, Guernica, The Writer's Chronicle, Transition, American Poet, Mosaic, Indiana Review, and Ecotone Magazine.

In 2011, she featured in the first poetry issue of Oprah Winfrey's O Magazine.

Griffiths was the creator of the series of video interview Poets on Poetry (P.O.P), in which contemporary poets discuss poetry "in relation to individual human experience and culture".

Speaking in 2015 about working in a variety of genres, she said: "I like the fluidity each genre offers me spatially, emotionally, and creatively. I can take an idea, word/fragment, or image and open it up across forms."

She is the author of five collections of poems: Miracle Arrhythmia (2010), The Requited Distance (2011), Mule & Pear (2011), Lighting the Shadow (2015), and Seeing the Body (2020). In Seeing the Body, Griffiths uses photography as well as poetry to tell the story of her mother's death in 2014 and, as described by Guernica magazine, "brings together poetry and photography to powerful effect, providing the reader with an experience that’s both visually and emotionally arresting". For the Los Angeles Review of Books, "The result is a radiant and soulful collection." Seeing the Body was selected as one of NPR's Best Books of 2020, and was a nominee for the 2021 NAACP Image Award for Outstanding Literary Work – Poetry. Seeing the Body won the 2021 Hurston/Wright Legacy Award for Poetry, and was also the winner of the 2021 Paterson Poetry Prize awarded by the Poetry Center at Passaic County Community College.

Anthologies in which work by Griffiths has appeared include Black Nature: Four Centuries of African American Nature Poetry (edited by Camille T. Dungy, 2009), New Daughters of Africa, edited by Margaret Busby (2019), and The Best American Poetry 2021 (edited by Tracy K. Smith).

Griffiths was chosen as poet-in-residence for 2020 at the Stella Adler Studio of Acting.

In February 2021, Griffiths was guest editor for the Academy of American Poets initiative Poem-a-Day.

Her forthcoming debut novel, entitled Promise, will be published by Random House.

She lives in New York City.

Personal life
In 2021, Griffiths married Indian-born, British-American novelist Salman Rushdie.

Bibliography
 Miracle Arrhythmia (Willow Books, 2010)
 The Requited Distance (The Sheep Meadow Press, 2011)
 Mule & Pear (New Issues Poetry & Prose, 2011)
 Lighting the Shadow (Four Way Books, 2015)
 Seeing the Body, poetry and photography (W. W. Norton, 2020)

Further reading

 Ron Slate, "Commentary: on Seeing The Body, poems and photographs by Rachel Eliza Griffiths", On the Seawall, July 15, 2020.

References

External links
 Official website
 Roxane Gay, "The Rumpus Interview with Rachel Eliza Griffiths", The Rumpus, January 12, 2012.
 Danielle Susi, "Dinnerview: Rachel Eliza Griffiths", Entropy, June 12, 2015.
 Natalie Diaz, "The PEN Ten with Rachel Eliza Griffiths", PEN America, November 17, 2015.
 Kevin Young, "Rachel Eliza Griffiths Reads W.S. Merwin", The New Yorker: Poetry, April 17, 2019.
 "Ten Questions for Rachel Eliza Griffiths", Poets & Writers, June 9. 2020.
 "Interview with Rachel Eliza Griffiths", Four Way Review, June 15, 2020.
 "Poets House Presents: Rachel Eliza Griffiths", YouTube, June 19, 2020.
 "Stopping by with Rachel Eliza Griffiths", Poetry Society of America, 2021.
 Susan Thornton Hobby, "Poetry Moment: Poems of beauty and terror with Rachel Eliza Griffiths", Hocopolitso, January 1, 2021.

1978 births
21st-century African-American women writers
21st-century African-American writers
21st-century American women writers
African-American poets
American women poets
Date of birth missing (living people)
Living people
Photographers from New York City
Poets from Washington, D.C.
Sarah Lawrence College alumni
University of Delaware alumni